
This article lists persons and politicians who have been appointed as the Deputy Minister of Finance in Indonesia.

References 

Government of Indonesia
Indonesian people by occupation